Baykino is a rural locality (a village) in Zaboryinskoye Rural Settlement, Beryozovsky District, Perm Krai, Russia. The population was 84 as of 2010. There are 2 streets.

Geography 
Baykino is located 18 km south of  Beryozovka (the district's administrative centre) by road. Taz Russky is the nearest rural locality.

References 

Rural localities in Beryozovsky District, Perm Krai